Theology of the Body is the topic of a series of 129 lectures given by Pope John Paul II during his Wednesday audiences in St. Peter's Square and the Paul VI Audience Hall between September 5, 1979, and November 28, 1984. It constitutes an analysis on human sexuality. The complete addresses were later compiled and  expanded upon in many of John Paul's encyclicals, letters, and exhortations.

In Theology of the Body, John Paul II intends to establish an adequate anthropology in which the human body reveals God. He examines man and woman before the Fall, after it, and at the resurrection of the dead. He also contemplates the sexual complementarity of man and woman. He explores the nature of marriage, celibacy and virginity, and expands on the teachings in Humanae vitae on contraception. According to author Christopher West, the central thesis of John Paul's Theology of the Body is that "the body, and it alone, is capable of making visible what is invisible: the spiritual and the divine.  It was created to transfer into the visible reality of the world, the mystery hidden since time immemorial in God, and thus to be a sign of it."

At present the Theology of the Body has been widely used and included in the curriculum of the Marriage Preparation Course in the Catholic dioceses of the United States.

Preceding developments in the history of ideas
The series of addresses were given as a reflection on the creation of man as male and female, as a sexual being. They sought to respond to certain “distorted ideas and attitudes” fundamental to the sexual revolution. Pope John Paul II addresses how the common understanding of the human body which analyzes it as a mechanism leads to objectification, that is, a loss of understanding of its intrinsic, personal meaning. Pope John Paul's thought is influenced by his earlier philosophical interests including the  phenomenological approaches of Edmund Husserl and Max Scheler, and especially by the philosophical action theory of Thomas Aquinas which analyzes human acts in the context of what is done, freely chosen, and felt, while presupposing that those acts are made possible due to the substantial union of soul and matter as required by hylomorphism. Key pre-papal writings on these topics include Love and Responsibility, The Acting Person, and various papers collected in Person and Community. These themes are continued in John Paul II's theological anthropology, which analyzes the nature of human beings in relation to God. The Theology of the Body presents an interpretation of the fundamental significance of the body, and in particular of sexual differentiation and complementarity, one which aims to challenge common contemporary philosophical views. Nevertheless, the pope's personalistic phenomenology is "echoing what he learned from St. John of the Cross" and is "in harmony with St. Thomas Aquinas".

Francis Bacon
Francis Bacon was an early empiricist who focused on problems of knowledge. In his Great Instauration, he argued that the current state of knowledge is immature and not advancing. His purpose was for the human mind to have authority over nature through understanding and knowledge. Bacon argued against Aristotle's final and formal cause, stating that "the final cause rather corrupts than advances the sciences." He thought that focusing on formal causality is an impediment to knowledge, because power is gained by focusing on matter that is observable and experienced, not just a figment of the mind. His emphasis on power over nature contributed to the rise of an understanding of nature as mechanism and the claim that true knowledge of nature is that expressed by mechanical laws. Pope John Paul II saw Bacon's conception of knowledge and its proper object as the beginning of the split between person and body, which is his goal to reconcile.

René Descartes
René Descartes furthered a mathematical approach to philosophy and epistemology through skepticism and rationalism, emphasizing the practical value of power over nature. In his Discourse on Method, Descartes said, “we can find a practical [philosophy], by which knowing the nature and behavior of fire, water, air, stars, the heavens, and all the other bodies which surround us…we can employ these entities for all the purposes for which they are suited, and so make ourselves the masters and possessors of nature”. In addition to the importance of power over nature, Descartes (like Bacon) insisted upon dismissing final cause, stating that “the entire class of causes which people customarily derive from a thing’s ‘end,’ I judge to be utterly useless”.

Descartes’ practical philosophy also proposed a dualism between the mind and the physical body, based on the belief that they are two distinct substances. The body is matter that is spatially extended, whereas the mind is the substance that thinks and contains the rational soul. Pope John Paul II responded to this dualism in his Letter to Families in 1994: “It is typical of rationalism to make a radical contrast in man between spirit and body, between body and spirit. But man is a person in the unity of his body and his spirit. The body can never be reduced to mere matter”. Pope John Paul II maintained that the stark Cartesian opposition between body and spirit leads to human sexuality as an area for manipulation and exploitation, rather than wonder and unity as he addresses in the Theology of the Body lectures.

Immanuel Kant
Pope John Paul II admitted that the work of Immanuel Kant was the “starting ground” of many of his reflections. Kant, like Bacon and Descartes, believed that natural science can only progress through the mathematical-materialist determinist study of nature. However, Kant saw danger in those laws of nature if God is excluded because morality and religion are called into question. Kant's solution to that danger was to insist that theoretical reason is limited in regards to morality and religion. Reason and sense-data should not be used to try to answer the question of God. Kant stated, “I had to do away with knowledge to make room for faith”. That faith led to the development of Kant's personalism. In his Critique of Pure Reason, Kant said, “the conviction [of faith] is not a logical but a moral certainty; and because it rests on subjective bases (of the moral attitude), I must not even say, It is morally certain that there is a God, etc., but I must say, I am morally certain, etc." That ideology allows each person to choose their own terms for reality and morality, because they cannot be argued against using theoretical reason.

Kant's personalism extends from faith and applies to moral dignity, autonomy, and freedom. Pope John Paul II agreed with some aspects of personalism but criticized Kant as believing in “anti-trinitarian personalism,” which removes the relational character of the Trinity to focus on an autonomous self. Kant's views on the autonomous self placed each human's conscience acting as a personal “lawmaker” for subjective morality, but John Paul II argued that a human's conscience cannot create moral norms, rather it must discover them in objective truth.

The difference between Kant's view and Pope John Paul II's view of personalism is made clear throughout the Theology of the Body in arguments about sex, marriage, and polygamy. Kant had two principles of sexual ethics: that one must not “enjoy” another person solely for pleasure and that sexual union involves giving oneself to another. Pope John Paul II agreed on those principles, yet disagreed on the meaning and reasoning behind the principles. Kant believed that people lose their autonomy and dignity in sexual acts, because they are reduced to things being used for pleasure. Marriage resolves that by giving the spouses “lifelong mutual possession of their sexual characteristics”. However, Kant's explanation of marriage still does not transform the objectifying nature of sex, it merely permits it as legal. On the other hand, Pope John Paul II explains the sexual act in marriage as fulfillment of the natural law of spousal love. Rather than objectifying and depersonalizing, it is enriching for a person because it is a sincere gift of the self in love. Pope John Paul II highlights conjugal love, whereas Kant does not acknowledge it.

John of the Cross
Pope John Paul II's basic beliefs on love, when he was establishing his Theology of the Body, was derived from Saint John of the Cross (San Juan de la Cruz), a Spanish mystic and Doctor of the Church. Karol Wojtyla—before he became Pope John Paul II—defended his doctoral dissertation, later translated in a book titled Faith According to Saint John of the Cross, in June 1948 at the future Pontifical University of Saint Thomas Aquinas. In that work, John of the Cross's influence is shown in his belief that relationship with God is a unifying process in which its elements actuated dynamically. Other influence is that he values love over faith, and that love "draws the person into a real ontological and psychological union with God".

The "Sanjuanist triangle" of love consists of three points: 1) Love is self-giving; 2) Filial love to God and conjugal love in marriage are the self-giving paradigm; 3) Relationship between the Father, the Son, and the Holy Spirit within the Trinity is the model of self-giving love. Through pure love, a person experiences God in the "mutual exchange of self-donation".

Thomas Petri O.P. writes, "We may also note Wojtyla's observation that for John of the Cross, God is objective but not objectivizable to the intellect, which naturally lends itself to the personalistic norm that will eventually hold pride of place in Wojtyla's thought. Like the person of God, no human person can ever be a mere object of our actions but must be understood in relationship."

Delivery
Theology of the Body is the topic of a series of 129 lectures given by Pope John Paul II during his Wednesday audiences in St. Peter's Square and the Paul VI Audience Hall between September 5, 1979 and November 28, 1984. It constitutes an analysis on human sexuality, and is considered as the first major teaching of his pontificate. Denis Read, O.C.D. says that, by means of the Theology of the Body, "John Paul II gave the Church the beginning of a mystical philosophy of life." The complete addresses were later compiled and expanded upon in many of John Paul's encyclicals, letters, and exhortations.

The delivery of the Theology of the Body series did have interruptions.  For example, the Wednesday audiences were devoted to other topics during the Holy Year of Redemption in 1983.

Topics
 

The work covers such topics as the unified corporeal and spiritual qualities of the human person; the origins, history and destiny of humanity; the deepest desires of the human heart and the way to experience true happiness and freedom; the truth about man's need and desire for loving communion derived from the revealed understanding of humanity in the image of a Triune Creator; the truth about God's original design for human sexuality and thus the dignity of the human person, how it was distorted through sin, and how it has been restored and renewed through the redemption of Jesus Christ; and Catholic teachings about the sacramentality of marriage.

The central thesis of John Paul's Theology of the Body, according to author Christopher West, is that "the body, and it alone, is capable of making visible what is invisible: the spiritual and the divine.  It was created to transfer into the visible reality of the world, the mystery hidden since time immemorial in God, and thus to be a sign of it."

The work consists of two halves and five cycles.  The first half, entitled "The Words of Christ" consists of three cycles in which John Paul II establishes an "adequate anthropology." Cycle 1 looks at the human person as we were created to be "in the beginning" (original man); Cycle 2 addresses human life after original sin, unredeemed and redeemed (historical man). Cycle 3 treats the reality of our life at the end of time when Christ comes back again and history reaches its fulfillment (eschatological man). John Paul II also places his reflections on virginity for the kingdom within the context of Cycle 3. In the second half, entitled "The Sacrament" (which refers to the sacrament of marriage), John Paul II addresses the sacramentality of marriage in Cycle 4 and the responsible transmission of human life in Cycle 5.

Some consider the very first encyclical of Pope Benedict XVI, Deus caritas est (God is Love), with its exposition of the relation between agape and eros, to be the culmination of John Paul II's Theology of the Body. For John Paul II's theology, eros has an inherent nuptial meaning but that its role is a sustaining theme for the body if logic is followed.

Man and woman "in the beginning"

In this first cycle, beginning on September 5, 1979, Pope John Paul II discusses Christ's answer to the Pharisees when they ask him about whether a man can divorce his wife. Christ responds "He said to them: Because Moses by reason of the hardness of your heart permitted you to put away your wives: but from the beginning it was not so". John Paul II draws attention to how Christ's response calls the Pharisees to harken back to the beginning, to the created world before the fall of man and original sin. The pope dives into the experience of original man through the book of Genesis, and identifies two unique experiences: original solitude, and original unity. Original solitude is the experience of Adam, prior to Eve, when he realizes that through naming the animals there is something intrinsically different about himself. He is unable to find a suitable partner. This self-realization of a dignity before God higher than the rest of creation is original solitude. Original unity is drawn from man's first encounter with woman, where he exclaims "This now is bone of my bones, and flesh of my flesh; she shall be called woman, because she was taken out of man". Prior the Fall, the pope accounts, man and woman's desire for one another was perfectly oriented in a Sacramental way that pointed them toward God's ultimate plan for humanity: the marriage of Christ the bridegroom with his bride the Church. Throughout Sacred Scripture, the most common reference that Christ uses when speaking of heaven is that of a wedding feast. Thus, marriage is intended to be a union that draws us deeper into the mystery of our creation and provides a foretaste of the heavenly marriage between Christ and his Church, where man and woman are no longer given in marriage. In heaven, the eternal wedding feast, men and women have now arrived at their ultimate destination and no longer have need of the Sacrament (or sign) of marriage.

Man and woman after the Fall

This second cycle focuses on Christ's remarks on adultery in the Sermon on the Mount:You have heard that it was said to them of old: Thou shalt not commit adultery. But I say to you, that whosoever shall look on a woman to lust after her, hath already committed adultery with her in his heart.Pope John Paul II explains this as looking at another person, even at his/her own partner, to desire them in a reductive way, that is they are viewed as merely an object of desire. Pope John Paul II says this seems to be a key passage for theology of the body.

Man and woman after the Resurrection of the Dead

The third cycle analyzes Christ's answer to the Sadducees when they come to him and ask him about a woman who had married seven brothers.

Celibacy and virginity

The fourth cycle is a meditation on celibacy and virginity.

Pope John Paul II stated that continence for the sake of the Kingdom is not opposed to marriage. He noted that when arguing with the Pharisees about whether is it licit to divorce and Jesus' disciples inferred that it was better not to marry, Jesus did not address whether it was expedient or not to marry, but pointed out that there are "eunuchs" and some are so willingly for the sake of the kingdom of heaven.

Sacrament of marriage
The fifth cycle discusses the sacrament of marriage.

Contraception

Pope John Paul II began his discussion of contraception on 11 July 1984 with the 114th lecture in this series.  This section of the lecture series, the sixth and final part, is largely a reflection on Humanae vitae, the 1968 encyclical of Pope Paul VI.  In it, John Paul continued his emphasis on the design of the human body revealing God's truths. It is explained and reaffirmed that the fundamental structure of males and females, which causes sexual intercourse between them to result in both greater intimacy and the capability of generating new life, demonstrates a morally inseparable connection between these two functions.

The authority of the Magisterium (teaching authority of the Church and those who hold the office) to interpret the divine intention (in this context, through the structure of the body), is emphasized. Although not all of the Church's teachings on sexuality are present in a literal reading of the biblical text, John Paul gives examples of how they are part of longstanding Church tradition — a tradition that was created in the context of scriptural teachings.

The ability of the human body to express truth through the sexual union of married couples is acclaimed.  The moral wrongness of using artificial means to manipulate such a significant aspect of the created body is explained.  Dominion over outside forces, and also self-mastery through discipline, are integral human drives.  However, the language expressed by bodies, in this context the language expressed during sexual intercourse, is so damaged by the use of artificial contraception that the conjugal act "ceases to be an act of love... [or] communion of persons" but rather is a mere bodily union.

On the other hand, the licitness of natural family planning (NFP) methods is held to be evident from the structure of the human body, which has natural periods of fertility and infertility.  The morality of these methods was literally designed into the body, and use of them, unlike use of artificial contraception, can actually improve the dialog between couples which is expressed through the language of the body. Throughout these speeches the main emphasis is on the intrinsic goodness of the marital act. The power of love between spouses is said to both lead to and be nourished by the moral use of the conjugal act.  Thus, moral exercise of sexual intercourse uses the form of the body to reveal the love of God toward Creation.

While following the rules of NFP does not guarantee a truly spiritual sexual relationship between husband and wife, understanding the theology that makes NFP acceptable can foster the maturity needed by the couple to attain that level of spirituality, living life by the Holy Spirit. Also, Pope John Paul II warns couples against "lowering the number of births in their family below the morally correct level." Responsible parenthood is greatly encouraged, however it is emphasized that while this sometimes means limiting family size, responsible parenthood can also mandate couples to increase their family size.  This is because of the good that children bring not only to their immediate family, but also to their society and Church.

The seriousness of a couple's decision to maintain or increase their family size is discussed. John Paul refers to Gaudium et spes, a document issued by the Second Vatican Council, which emphasizes the importance of couples' having their conscience guided by the law of God. The difficulty inherent in and endurance required to consciously regulate births with these methods is discussed, although largely in the context of the integral part played by the burdens of life as Christians follow the "hard way" through the "narrow gate".  In fact, the kind of discipline necessary to practice periodic continence is claimed to impart licit conjugal acts with deeper meaning, as well as bringing out the ability of a married couple to express love through non-sexual acts.

John Paul states many other benefits claimed for moral use of NFP, some from Humanae vitae.  These include an increase of marital peace, less spousal selfishness, increased and more positive influence over their children (5 September 1984), and increased dignity of person through following the law of God. Use of NFP is also said to increase appreciation of children, by fostering respect for what is created by God.

Assessments

By Pope John Paul II
Pope John Paul II's last book, Memory and Identity, mentions the importance of the Thomistic philosophy and theology of the prominent doctor of the Catholic Church St. Thomas Aquinas to come to a deeper understanding of the Pope's personalist (phenomenological) presentation of Humanae vitae in his Theology of the Body catechesis, since he saw the limitations of a strictly phenomenological approach. He wrote:

By George Weigel 
George Weigel has described Theology of the Body as "one of the boldest reconfigurations of Catholic theology in centuries." He goes on to say it is a "kind of theological time bomb set to go off with dramatic consequences, sometime in the third millennium of the Church." Weigel believes that it has barely begun to "shape the Church's theology, preaching, and religious education" but when it does "it will compel a dramatic development of thinking about virtually every major theme in the Creed."

Weigel also realizes major obstacles to the theology of the body.  The Pope is very hard to read and understand: "The density of John Paul's material is one factor. A secondary literature capable of translating John Paul's thought into accessible categories and vocabulary is badly needed."  And, Weigel believes, the dominant liberal views on such issues as women's rights, birth control, abortion and divorce are also obstacles to the "theology of the body" becoming known or accepted.

Many of Weigel's concerns with respect to being able to understand the set of Wednesday General Audiences on the Theology of the Body have been addressed in the new translation, Man and Woman He Created Them: A Theology of the Body (2006, Michael Waldstein, translator).  One of the drawbacks of the prior English-language versions is that different translators were used at varying times over the long period that the Audience talks were given.  Hence, it happened occasionally that the same term would be translated differently from one talk to the other.  The new translation has corrected that problem in addition to being confirmed by having had access to John Paul's original notes in Polish, rather than merely the Italian used in the Audience talks.

By Christopher West 
In his Theology of the Body Explained Christopher West, who has been teaching John Paul's theology of the body since the late 1990s, wrote, "John Paul's TOB is most often cast as an extended catechesis on marriage and sexual love. It certainly is that, but it is also so much more. Through the mystery of the Incarnate person and the biblical analogy of spousal love, John Paul II's catechesis illumines the entirety of God's plan for human life from origin to eschaton with a splendid supernatural light."

Philosopher-theologian Alice von Hildebrand, widow of 20th century philosopher-theologian Dietrich von Hildebrand, stated that West "misunderstood the authentic Catholic tradition", promotes a "hyper-sexualized approach", "puts too much emphasis on the body in a culture in which everything is body-centered", has an "infatuation with pop culture and rock and roll" which "is a long way from the austere spirit of the New Testament", and uses "loose language". Alice cited Dr David Schindler's "critique of West" that West used "phallic symbolism to describe the Easter candle". Alice contrasts West and Dietrich.

By John Cornwell 
In his account of the reign of John Paul II, author John Cornwell says of the Theology of the Body: "This work, which constitutes, in the view of some keen papal supporters, John Paul's vital legacy to the world, has been perhaps his least influential."

By Charles Curran 
Dissident Catholic moral theologian Charles E. Curran, writing in his book The Moral Theology of Pope John Paul II, says the pope's Wednesday audiences are unlikely to have been understood by many of those present at the time: "Quite frankly, the talks do not seem appropriate for the occasion. They are somewhat theoretical and too detailed for a general audience. In addition, because each individual talk is part of a larger whole, it is difficult to understand the full meaning of any short talk without seeing the whole picture. I am sure that most of those in attendance at the audiences did not follow what the pope was saying." Curran also makes the point that such talks have "little or no importance from the viewpoint of authoritative teaching," and that the pope appears to be unaware of contemporary biblical scholarship and makes no mention of any contemporary scholars of any type.

Curran also believes the Theology of the Body "clearly cannot serve as a theology for all persons and all bodies", and that "there are many people for whom the 'nuptial meaning' of the body he develops are not appropriate. As with many utopias, the elderly are missing. But also most obviously the unmarried - people who are single, people who are widowed, and homosexuals. The pope at one point tries to show how virginity and celibacy can be understood within the terms of his ideas about the 'nuptial meaning' of the body, but these arguments are unconvincing." On the positive side, Curran says the pope "strongly supports the equality of men and women in marriage and expressly opposes any subordination of the woman to the man."

Thomas Petri, O.P. says, "Charles Curran can be excused for his criticism to the contrary since it was made before the publication of Waldstein's translation."

By Kenneth L. Woodward 
The religion editor for Newsweek, Kenneth L. Woodward, has described John Paul's Theology of the Body as "a highly romantic and unrealistic view of human sexuality".

By Sebastian Moore, OSB 
Benedictine Sebastian Moore, a controversial Catholic moral theologian who often criticizes some Catholic teachings, expresses his disagreement openly with the Theology of the Body. Moore criticizes what he regards as a lack of connection to real people in their real lives. Specifically he notes that while the pope reflects on the essential incompleteness of the body in its maleness and femaleness and on the mystery of the union of two in one flesh, he does not talk specifically about the various concrete experiences of the sexual act itself. Moore also argues that in his protracted discussion of the "shame" of Adam and Eve in the Garden of Eden when they become aware of their nakedness, the pope fundamentally misunderstands what the story is saying. In the Genesis account, according to Moore, "it is shame that sets the stage for lust", but "in the pope's account, it is the other way round: lust generates shame."

By Georg Schelbert 
Theologian Georg Schelbert, of the University of Fribourg in Switzerland, is critical of the Theology of the Body for its highly selective use of Scripture. Schelbert argues that it is clear that the biblical stories of the patriarchs in the Old Testament clearly permit polygamy, in contradiction of John Paul's statement that polygamy "directly rejects the plan of God as revealed in the beginning." He also notes that, in John Paul's discussion of divorce, "not a single word is said about the so-called Pauline privilege (or about the extension of that privilege, which for a long time was falsely called 'Petrine') which relaxes these rigorous conclusions".

See also
New feminism
Religion and sexuality#Christianity
Male and female he created them: toward a path of dialogue on the question of gender identity in education
 Christian naturism#Vatican

References

Further reading

External links
General Audiences: John Paul II's Theology of the Body. Summary of each lecture.

Catholic theology of the body
Works by Pope John Paul II